Finland competed at the 2014 Summer Youth Olympics with a team of 8 boys and 6 girls, winning one bronze medal.

Medalists 
Medals awarded to participants of mixed-NOC (Combined) teams are represented in italics. These medals are not counted towards the individual NOC medal tally.

Team

Archery

Finland qualified a female archer from its performance at the 2014 European Archery Youth Championships.

Individual

Mixed international team

Beach Volleyball

Finland qualified a boys' team from their performance at the 2014 CEV Youth Continental Cup Final.

Boxing

Finland qualified one boxer based on its performance at the 2014 AIBA Youth World Championships

Boys

Golf

Finland qualified one team of two athletes based on the 8 June 2014 IGF Combined World Amateur Golf Rankings.

Individual

Team

Gymnastics

Artistic Gymnastics

Finland qualified one athlete based on its performance at the 2014 European MAG Championships and another athlete based on its performance at the 2014 European WAG Championships.

Boys

Girls

Sailing

Finland qualified one girl.

Shooting

Finland was given a wild card to compete.

Individual

Mixed international team

Swimming

Finland qualified four swimmers.

Boys

Girls

Mixed

References

Links
 NOC Overview — Finland 

2014 in Finnish sport
Nations at the 2014 Summer Youth Olympics
Finland at the Youth Olympics